Raphitoma radula is a species of sea snail, a marine gastropod mollusk in the family Raphitomidae.

Description
The length of the shell varies between 12 mm and 19 mm, its diameter between 4 mm and 8 mm.

Distribution
This species occurs in the Central Mediterranean Sea off Palermo, Sicily; off France, Croatia and Algeria.

References

External links
 Monterosato T. A. (di) (1884). Nomenclatura generica e specifica di alcune conchiglie mediterranee. Palermo, Virzi, 152 pp
 Gastropods.com: Raphitoma (pupoides
 
 Riccardo Giannuzzi-Savelli, Francesco Pusateri, Riccardo Giannuzzi-Savelli, Riccardo Giannuzzi: A revision of the Mediterranean Raphitomidae, 3: on the Raphitoma pupoides (Monterosato, 1884) complex, with the description of a new species (Mollusca Gastropoda); Biodiversity Journal, 2016, 7 (1): 103–115

radula
Gastropods described in 1884